Rafael Asadov (Rafael Avaz oglu Asadov; 1952, in Ganja – 1992, in Agstafa District) was a National Hero of Azerbaijan.

Early life
Asadov was born on October 27, 1952 in Ganja. After graduating high school in 1969, he entered Tbilisi Art School. After graduating from a military school in 1973, he continued his education at Saint Petersburg Ngabi Artillery Academy. He served in the Armed Forces of the USSR in Hungary, Vietnam and Afghanistan.

In 1991, Asadov was an active participant in military operations in Aghdam, Goranboy, Tovuz and Gadabay regions.

Private life
He was married. Two children have been left behind. He was killed on November 12, 1992, while overseeing combat positions in preparation for the operation in the Agstafa region. He was buried in the Alley of Martyrs in Baku.

Recognition
After his death, he was named a National Hero of Azerbaijan by Decree No. 202 on September 16, 1994.

References 

National Heroes of Azerbaijan
1952 births
1992 deaths
Azerbaijani military personnel of the Nagorno-Karabakh War
Military personnel from Ganja, Azerbaijan